Valérie Hermann is a French businesswoman. She is the managing director of the fashion and luxury division of EPI, a private investment fund based in Paris.

Early life
Valérie Hermann was born and raised in Concarneau. Her parents and older siblings are surgeons.

Career
After graduating from HEC Paris in 1985, she joined the Comité Colbert, an association of French companies in the luxury industry. In 1989, she was president of Jacques Fath Couture et Parfums. From 1989 to 1993, she took over the commercial management of Ercuis (silversmith) and Raynaud (porcelain). In 1996, she was appointed director of John Galliano SA. Three years later, she became director of women's ready-to-wear collections designed by John Galliano for Christian Dior.

In 2005, she was appointed CEO of Yves Saint Laurent (now Saint Laurent Paris), which is part of the PPR group. Together with artistic director Stefano Pilati, who succeeded Tom Ford, she helped restore the company's deficit during the financial crisis of 2007-2008. Hermann developed the sale of accessories, leather goods, bags and shoes. In 2008, she won the “Femmes en or” trophy in the "business" category. In 2009, Hermann was appointed to the board of directors of the PPR Foundation and was ranked 46th in the Fortune's ranking of the world's most powerful women in business.

In 2011, she left  YSL and became CEO of the New York fashion brand Reed Krakoff. Hermann is an independent director of Moncler since December 2013.

In 2014, she joined Ralph Lauren and became president of the luxury collections. She was responsible for the brand strategy, merchandising, distribution and expansion until 2016 when she took over the global leadership of the brand. Her portfolio of brands included the luxury collections, the Polo and Denim brands, Ralph Lauren home, and all accessories.

In December 2019, it was announced that Hermann was leaving Ralph Lauren to join private investment firm EPI as managing director of its fashion and luxury division, which includes the brands Bonpoint and J.M. Weston.

Personal life
She met her husband while studying at HEC Paris. They have three daughters.

Distinctions
Hermann became a Knight of The Legion of Honour in 2007. She was awarded the Femme en Or trophy in the "Business" category.

References

Living people
1963 births
People from Concarneau
French chief executives
Dior people
HEC Paris alumni